A flat-eight engine, also called a horizontally-opposed eight, is an eight-cylinder piston engine with two banks of four inline cylinders, one on each side of a central crankshaft, 180° apart.

In a flat-eight engine, the connecting rods for corresponding pistons from the left and right banks may share a crankshaft journal. A boxer-eight engine is a special case of a flat-eight where each piston's connecting rod has its own journal, and each pair of opposed pistons moves inwards or outwards at the same time.

Flat-eight engines have been used in automotive, aircraft, and marine applications.

Design 

The advantages of a flat-eight engine are its minimal length and low centre of mass. A disadvantage is its greater width compared to a V8 or inline-eight engine. A flat-eight engine is able to have perfect primary balance and secondary balance.

A boxer-eight engine has a single piston per crankpin, which increases the linear offset between the cylinder banks. A boxer-eight with nine main bearings may be thought of as two boxer-four engines laid end-to-end with a 90° phase angle between their crankshafts. 

Alternatively, a flat-eight engine where corresponding pistons from the two opposing banks share a crankshaft journal is often called a "180 degree V engine". One possible configuration for this design uses a two-plane crankshaft. Another configuration uses a 180° single-plane crankshaft with the leading and trailing crankpins in the same position, while the two central crankpins are in the opposite position.

Use in automobiles 

One of the earliest flat-eight engines was used in the 1904 Buffum Model G Greyhound racing car, which used an engine based on two of Buffum's existing flat-four engines joined together. The Model G was built in the United States and was introduced one year after the Winton Motor Carriage Company Bullet No. 2, which used a straight-8 engine. Around the same time, the first V8 engines were beginning to appear in Europe.

Several racing cars have used bespoke flat-eight engines based on two inline-four engines and a custom crankshaft. These include the 1928 Anderson Specials Number 2 built in Scotland using two Humber 9/20 engines. The car is on display at the Kelvingrove Art Gallery and Museum in Glasgow. Another example is a 1977 Eagle 72 chassis raced by Bruce Crower in the United States. This engine used the cylinder heads from two Chevrolet Cosworth Vega engines. In 1969, a one-off engine was built for racing driver Emerson Fittipaldi to compete in the Thousand Miles of Guanabara endurance race. This flat-eight engine was made by joining two 1.3 L Volkswagen flat-four crankcases with an elastomeric gasket and connecting the two crankshafts together. Several similar Volkswagen-based engines were built for Fittipaldi's racing cars in the early 1970s.

Porsche 

Porsche used flat-eight engines in various racing cars throughout the 1960s.

The first Porsche flat-eight was the Type 753. Work began on it in 1960, following the announcement of a  displacement limit for the 1961 Formula One season. Designed by Hans Mezger and Hans Honich, the engine includes features shaft-driven double-overhead camshafts, a two-piece magnesium crankcase casting, eight individual finned cylinder barrels, a solid crankshaft running in nine main bearings and Lucas electronic ignition. The version of the Type 753 used for its debut at the 1962 Dutch Formula One Grand Prix produced . At the 1962 French Grand Prix, the Type 753 engine delivered Porsche's only F1 race win as a constructor, in an 804 driven by Dan Gurney. The 753 also influenced the design of the flat-six engine used in the first-generation Porsche 911.

A  version of the Porsche flat-eight, designated the Type 771, was developed alongside the Type 753. This engine was intended for sports car and endurance racing, and was used in the Porsche 718 W-RS, Porsche 904/8), Porsche 906, Porsche 907, Porsche 909 and Porsche 910 racing cars between 1962 and 1968.

In 1968, a new flat-eight engine called the Type 908 was introduced in the Porsche 908, which competed in the Group 6 Prototype-Sports Cars category. The Type 908 was not based on the Type 771, but instead the Type 916 flat-six racing six-cylinder engine with two additional cylinders. Porsche also installed Type 908 engines into two Porsche 914/8 mid-engined road cars. The first of these was a concept study built by the head of the racing department, and the second was built as a 60th birthday present for the company chairman.

Although Porsche never produced any road cars with a flat-eight engine, a prototype of such an engine was built in the late 1960s and early 1970s. During this time, Posche had been commissioned by Volkswagen to develop "Project EA266", a replacement for the Volkswagen Beetle. Project EA266 was powered by a water-cooled inline-four engine which was mounted longitudinally under the rear passenger seat with the cylinders oriented horizontally. Porsche investigated using the Project EA266 chassis as the basis for a mid-engined replacement for the Porsche 911 called the "Typ 1966". As part of the Typ 1966 development process, a prototype water-cooled flat-eight engine was built. However, Project EA266 was cancelled by Volkswagen, all materials relating to the Typ 1966 were destroyed, including the prototype flat-eight engine.

Use in aircraft 

Several flat-eight aircraft engines have been produced over the years:

1948-1961 Lycoming GSO-580 Air-cooled, 9.47 L (578 cu in)
 1961-present Lycoming IO-720. Air-cooled, 
 1969-1975 Continental Tiara 8-380 (O-540) and T8-450 (O-540). Air-cooled, 
 1997-200? Jabiru 5100. Air-cooled, 
 2013-???? Engineered Propulsion Systems Vision 350. Turbo-diesel, water-cooled,

Use in marine vessels 
Flat-eight engines are seldom used in marine applications, with the 1957 Fageol VIP 88 outboard engine being a rare example of a production engine. The VIP 88 consisted of two  Crosley engine blocks joined on a common crankshaft.

Another marine engine was the one-off Miller 148 marine engine which was built in 1928 and used in the racing boat Miss Rioco III.

See also 
 Straight-eight engine
 V8 engine
 W8 engine

References

Flat-08
08